The Boxing Cats (Prof. Welton's), or simply Boxing Cats, is an 1894 American short silent film directed by William K.L. Dickson and William Heise, and starring Henry Welton. It depicts a boxing match between two cats, each of which is wearing a pair of boxing gloves. The two cats were members of Welton's touring "cat circus", which reportedly also featured cats riding bicycles.

The Boxing Cats was filmed in Thomas Edison's Black Maria studio in West Orange, New Jersey, on 35 mm. The film has been described as a precursor to cat videos popular on the Internet.

See also
 Men Boxing, an 1891 film also directed by Dickson and Heise

References

Further reading

External links
 
 The Boxing Cats (Prof. Welton's) at the Library of Congress

1894 films
Films directed by William Kennedy Dickson
Articles containing video clips
American boxing films
American black-and-white films
American silent short films
Films shot in New Jersey
Edison Manufacturing Company films
1890s American films